The following teams took part at the 1908 Summer Olympics:

Great Britain

Great Britain was represented by the England national amateur football team. 
Coach: Alfred Davis

The following players were also part of Great Britain's squad, but did not play in any matches: Robert Bill Bayley, Arthur Bell, John Charnley, Paul Hayden, Willie Jordan, Lionel Louch, Eversley Mansfield, Charles Horace Pearce, Arthur Prest, John Prosser, Ernest Proud, James Raine, Harold Uren, Ernest Williams, Gordon Wright

Denmark

Denmark was represented by the Denmark national football team.
Coach:  Charles Williams

Netherlands
Netherlands was represented by the Netherlands national football team.
Coach:  Edgar Chadwick

The following players were also part of the Dutch squad, but did not play in any matches: Jack Akkersdijk, Aaron Cas Julian Begeer, Kees Bekker, Jan Brutel de la Riviere, Jur Haak, John Heijning, Ernest Jacobi, Hannes Mads Linthout, Friedrich Giovanni Pluim, Noud Stempels, Sebastian Veen, Hubertus Leopoldus Visser, Willem Boerdam

Sweden

Sweden was represented by the Sweden national football team.

Head coach: Ludvig Kornerup

The following players were also part of Sweden's squad, but did not play in any matches: Erik Bergström, Kenneth Börjeson, Thor Ericsson, Gustav Thomas Lindblom, Gunnar Jonas Mellin

France

France was represented by the France national football team, divided into two squads.

France B

References

Sources
RSSSF
IFFSH archive
FIFA

1908 Summer Olympics
Football at the 1908 Summer Olympics